William Henry Hughes (2 October 1920 – 30 March 1995) was a Welsh professional footballer who played for Newcastle United, Hartlepool United and Annfield Plain, as a centre half.

References

1920 births
1995 deaths
Welsh footballers
Newcastle United F.C. players
Hartlepool United F.C. players
Annfield Plain F.C. players
English Football League players
Association football defenders